The 2015 Rhythmic Gymnastics European Championships, the 31st edition, took place from May 1 to 3 2015 in Minsk, Belarus at the Minsk-Arena.

Participating countries

Competition schedule
Friday May 1
10:00-12:10 CI junior groups 1st presentation
14:00-15:45 CI seniors individual hoop and ball Group C
16:00-18:00 CI seniors individual hoop and ball Group B
19:15-21:00 CI seniors individual hoop and ball Group A
Saturday May 2
10:00-12:15 CI junior groups 2nd presentation
14:00-16:00 CI seniors individual clubs and ribbon Group B
16:15-18:00 CI seniors individual clubs and ribbon Group C
18:15-20:00 CI seniors individual clubs and ribbon Group A
Sunday May 3
11:00-11:45 CIII Apparatus finals junior groups
13:30-14:20 CIII Apparatus finals seniors hoop and ball
14:55-15:45 CIII Apparatus finals seniors clubs and ribbon

Medalists

Results

Seniors

Team

Hoop

Ball

Clubs

Ribbon

Juniors

Group all-around

5 balls

Medal count

References 

European Rhythmic Gymnastics Championships
Rhythmic Gymnastics European Championships
Sports competitions in Minsk
International gymnastics competitions hosted by Belarus
2015 in Belarusian sport